Diana Seach is an English specialist in special education. She is a Principal Lecturer in Special Educational Needs and Early Years and Programme Co-ordinator for the National Award for Special Educational Needs Coordination.

Career

Seach established the smile: Interactive Play for Children with Autism programme in 2000. She taught in special education for twenty years. She has worked at the University of Chichester as a part-time senior lecturer for 12 years.

She was the founder of the Southdowns Support Group for families of children with autism. In 1994 they set up the Southdowns Family Centre in Rustington, West Sussex, which offers a range of activities including, play, music, art, sports, and sensory integration for children with autism and their families.

Seach is the author of three books on educating children with autism, most recently Interactive Play for Children with Autism: A Practical Guide for Teachers (2012)  and regularly writes and presents her work at conferences. She has developed a range of training programmes for parents and professionals, and has an established international consultancy.

Seach is a part-time Senior Lecturer in Early Years and Special Educational Needs at the University of Chichester.

Experience
Diana taught in special education for 20 years where she specialized in working with children who have profound learning difficulties and autism.

Books
Supporting Children with Autism in Mainstream Schools, co-authored with Miranda Preston and Michele Lloyd.
Interactive Play for Children with Autism, 2007
Autistic Spectrum Disorder: Positive Approaches for Teaching Children with ASD, 1998

References

External links
smile

Living people
British educational theorists
Academics of the University of Chichester
Year of birth missing (living people)